A. M. Raja (Ayyampalayam Masagounder Rajagounder) is an Indian politician born in 1928 and former Member of the Legislative Assembly of Tamil Nadu. He was elected to the Tamil Nadu legislative assembly as a Dravida Munnetra Kazhagam candidate from Bhavani constituency in 1967, and 1971 elections. He was one of the first in his family to graduate from University (with a degree in Tamil History and Literature). He spent much of his adult life in Madras where he owned construction companies that built bridges, and corporate buildings.  His lifelong interest in politics made him an important person at the statewide level especially with education reform and bringing access to higher education for all castes.  He had many advisory rolls at the state level in the DMK, and was a personal acquaintance of several Chief Ministers. L.

References 

Dravida Munnetra Kazhagam politicians
1928 births
Living people